was a Japanese long-distance runner who is credited by the International Association of Athletics Federations for setting a world's best in the marathon on April 3, 1935. According to the IAAF, Ikenaka's time of 2:26:44 was over a minute faster than the previous record set by Fusashige Suzuki three days earlier.

Notes

References

1914 births
1992 deaths
Japanese male long-distance runners
Japanese male marathon runners
World record setters in athletics (track and field)
People from Nakatsu, Ōita